Charles Rodgers Trotman (born March 15, 1958) is a former American football quarterback and safety who played one season in the United States Football League for the Birmingham Stallions. He went to college at Auburn.

Early life
Charlie Trotman was born on March 15, 1958, in Montgomery, Alabama. He went to Jefferson Davis High School.

College career
Trotman went to college at Auburn. He was their quarterback from 1977 to 1979. In 1980 he won the Cliff Hare Award.

Later career
After he graduated he became an attorney. In 1983 he made a return to football by playing in a few games for the Birmingham Stallions as a safety. His only stat was a 11-yard kick return. He later was a Auburn Tigers football announcer.

References

1958 births
Living people
Birmingham Stallions players
Auburn Tigers football players
Players of American football from Alabama
American football quarterbacks
American football safeties